Phase One is a Danish company specializing in high-end digital photography equipment and software. It manufactures open platform based medium format camera systems and solutions. Its RAW processing software, Capture One, supports many DSLRs besides their backs.

PODAS workshops (Phase One Digital Artist Series) is a series of worldwide photography workshops designed for digital photographers interested in working with medium format, high-resolution cameras. PODAS is a part of the Phase One educational division. Each attendee receives a Phase One digital camera system for the duration of the workshop.

On 18 February 2014, it was announced that UK-based private equity firm Silverfleet Capital would acquire a 60% majority stake in the company.

On 17 June 2019, Phase One A/S was once again sold, this time to the Danish investment company Axcel.

Products

Cameras
In 2009, Phase One purchased a major stake in Japanese Mamiya and the two companies developed products together. The following cameras are currently produced and sold by Phase One:
 Phase One XT
 Phase One XF
 Phase One 645DF+ (discontinued)
 Phase One 645DF (discontinued)
 Phase One 645AF (discontinued)
 Phase One iXM (aerial, surveillance and UAV operations)
 Phase One iXA (Aerial)
 Phase One iXG (Reproduction)
 Phase One iXR (Reproduction)
 Phase One iXU (aerial, surveillance and UAV operations)
 Phase One iXU-RS (aerial, surveillance and UAV operations)
 Phase One iXU-RS1900 (Fully self contained dual camera solution)
 Phase One iXM
 Phase One iXM-RS
 Phase One iXM-MV
 Phase One iXH (Reproduction)

The Phase One 645DF+ and 645DF cameras are medium format cameras which support both focal plane and leaf shutter lenses with shutter speeds ranging from 1/4000s to 60 minutes and flash synchronization up to 1/1600 sec. Among the new features on the 645DF+ are:
 Fast and accurate auto focus especially in low contrast environments
 Custom focus fine-tuning adjustment
 Rechargeable Li-ion battery with up to 10,000 captures on one charge
 Rugged construction for high volume production use

The Phase One V-Grip Air vertical grip is compatible with the 645DF+/645DF. The V-Grip Air supports a Profoto Air flash trigger for wireless flash synchronization.

The 645DF+/645DF supports digital back interfaces including the IQ and P+ series digital backs as well as 3rd party digital backs from Hasselblad, Leaf and others.

In 2012, Phase One released two specialty cameras: iXR which is made specifically for reproduction and iXA which is made specifically for aerial photography. Both uses the 645 lenses as the normal 645 cameras. Main difference on this camera is they have no viewfinder and very few mechanical moving parts.

In 2013, Phase One signed a collaborative distribution agreement with Digital Transitions (DT) to deliver advanced digitization solutions for cultural heritage preservation imaging projects worldwide (Repro camera solutions). The range of Digital Transitions digitization equipment includes a multitude of reprographic benches, purpose-built reprographic cameras, specialized book copy stations, film scanning kits, and accessories that are designed to host the line of Phase One digital capture hardware and Capture One software.

In 2014, Phase One launched a medium format digital back with a CMOS/active pixel sensor: The IQ250. All Phase One digital backs launched prior to the IQ250 have sensors based on the CCD (Charge-coupled device) technology.

In 2015, Phase One introduced the XF camera system. It is a new digital camera platform, medium format system built with the intention to upgrade it over a series of updates throughout the product lifetime. At the same time, the IQ3 series digital backs were introduced. This included the IQ3 50MP based on the previous IQ250, the IQ3 60MP based on the previous IQ260 and the newly introduced IQ3 80MP which includes a new CCD (Charge-coupled device) sensor exclusive to Phase One.

Lenses
The 645DF / DF+ / XF is compatible with the following lenses:
 Phase One Digital focal plane lenses
 Schneider Kreuznach leaf shutter lenses
 Mamiya 645 AF lenses
 Mamiya 645 manual lenses
 Compatible with Hasselblad V and Pentacon 6 (via multimount adaptor)

Phase One

Schneider Kreuznach

Rodenstock
Phase One XT compatible lenses

*In addition, any medium or large format lens which has sufficient image circle and resolution with the Cambo lens mount

Industrial lenses

RS Lenses compatible with iXM-RS

RSM lenses compatible with iXM

Lenses for iXM-MV
NOTE: iXM-MV is also compatible with Schneider-Kreuznach medium format lenses

Digital backs

IQ4 series

IQ3 series

IQ2 series

IQ1 series

The IQ series Phase One backs included many industry-first innovations. It was the first camera series to utilize a USB 3 connection. At the time of the release, this was not very widespread, but did allow for backwards compatibility with USB 2.0. It was also the first camera series to include a high resolution multi-touch display, similar to the "Retina" screen used in the iPhone 4.

P+ series
The P+ series are similar to the normal P series but have higher capture speeds, better response to long exposure times, and add Live Preview, which allows the user to focus and compose on a monitor while tethered. Also, a new high resolution LCD screen was implemented with better resolution and luminance.

P series

The P series are fully untethered backs available for many different camera mounts.

H series

The H series are tethered backs available for many different camera mounts. Camera back connects through standard 6pin IEEE 1394. Originally this type of camera back was released as the "Lightphase", a continuation of Phase One's previous tradition of using the name "phase" in the name of the product. This changed with the release of the "H20", which was originally called "Lightphase H20" but the name was changed to "Phase One H20" for better brand recognition.

Scan backs
The Scan backs are tethered digital scan backs. All use SCSI connection except for PowerPhase FX, which uses IEEE 1394 "Firewire". The very early models, which were known as the CB6x (StudioKit) and FC70 (PhotoPhase), were made in plastic and had an external control unit that connected to a computer through NuBus.

XF Camera System feature updates 
The XF Camera System is upgradable and received various planned new features and functionality over its product lifetime.
 Feature Update #1 - October 2015
 Vibration Delay, Bullseye Level Tool, Hyperfocal Point Tool, Capture One Focus Step
 Feature Update #2 - March 2016
 Focus Stacking Tool, Timelapse Tool, HAP-1 Update, OneTouch UI
 Feature Update #3 - October 2016
 Profoto Air Tool, Electronic Shutter, Flash Analysis, Icon Control
 Feature Update #4 - September 2017
 Autofocus & Recompose, Automatic Focus Stack Calculator, Focus Trim Tool, Vibration Analysis
Creative Control Enhancement (Feature Update #5) - July 2019
Automated Frame Averaging, Custom IQ Styles, Storage Flexibility Options (IQ4 Only)
XT Update Package (Feature Update #6) - October 2019
Update to support the new XT body and lenses (IQ4 Only)
Phase One Lab update (Feature Update #7) - March 2020
Support for new Dual Exposure+ (IQ4-150 Only)
Feature Update #8 - December 2020
Support for CFExpress, higher capture rate on XF body, ETTR option, Ad-Hoc WiFi.

Repro camera solutions
Phase One reprographic camera systems and book capture / scanners are purpose-built to provide preservation-level rapid capture of rare books, circulation materials, manuscripts, documents, photographic slides, photographic negatives and photographic glass-plates.

Phase One repro camera solutions include the following products:

iXG / iXH series

 Phase One IXR camera body (Uses an option of different camera backs)

The above camera systems are purpose built for the following solutions but compatible with standard Reproduction systems.
 RG3040 reprographic system
 RGC180 capture cradle
 BC100 Book capture system
 Film scanning kit

Industrial Cameras

iXM-RS series

iXM series

iXU-RS series

iXU series

iXA series

Imaging software
The Capture One software comes in several flavours but is still a single binary. License key and option selected determine which version is active:
 PRO, this is the full features version which supports all cameras which Capture One lists as supported.
 PRO for Sony, full featured but only supports Sony branded cameras.
 PRO for Fuji, full featured but only supports Fuji branded cameras.
 PRO for Nikon, full featured but only supports Nikon branded cameras.
 Enterprise, this is the full features version which supports all cameras which Capture One lists as supported but has also additional feature for Enterprise license management and specialised features such as barcode reading.
 CH, specialised version for cultural heritage, has some features which PRO does not, like resolution ruler, auto-crop etc., support only Phase One IIQ RAW files.
 DB, also called "Capture One for Phase One" free version, full featured like PRO but works only with Phase One IIQ RAW files.
 Express for Sony limited featured version, works only with Sony branded camera.
 Express for Fuji limited featured version, works only with Fuji branded camera.
 Express for Nikon limited featured version, works only with Nikon branded camera.
 Capture One – Various editions of the software have been available: Capture One, Capture One PRO, Capture One DB, Capture One CH, Capture One Express, Capture One SE, Capture One LE, and Capture One REBEL.
 Lightphase Capture 2.x (discontinued, changed name to "Capture One" from version 2.7)

Capture One companion software:
 Capture Pilot (available on the Apple App Store)

DAM software (discontinued)
 Media Pro SE
 Media Pro 1  (formerly known as Microsoft Expression Media and iView MediaPro)

Studio management software
 Portrait One (discontinued)
 Portrait One Executive
 Portrait One Lite
 Portrait One Sales

Product releases (in chronological order)
 CB6x and FC70 - 1993
 PhotoPhase (+) - 1995/1996
 StudioKit - 1996
 PowerPhase - 1997
 LightPhase (BB00) - 1998 (Gen 1. Hasselblad V mount)
 LightPhase (BB01) - 1998/1999 (Gen 2. Hasselblad V mount)
 LightPhase (BB02) - 1999 (Gen 3. Hasselblad V mount)
 LightPhase (Mamiya and Contax 645 versions and BB03) - 1999
 PowerPhase FX - 2000
 H20 - 2001
 PowerPhase FX+ - 2002
 H5 and H10 6 MP (re-branded Lightphase) - 2002
 H10 (11 MP) - 2002
 H101 (H10 11 MP, Hasselblad H1 design) - 2002
 H25 - 2003
 P20 and P25 - 2004
 P21, P30, and P45 - 2005
 P20+, P21+, P25+, P30+, and P45+ - 2007
 Phase One 645AF - 2008
 P65+ - 2008
 Phase One 645DF - 2009
 P40+ - 2009
 IQ180, IQ160, IQ140 - 2011
 Phase One iXR and Phase One iXA - 2012
 Phase One 645DF+ - 2012
 IQ280, IQ260, IQ260 achromatic - 2013
 IQ250 - 2014
 Phase One iXU - 2014
 IQ150 - 2014
 Phase One XF May 2015 (645 camera body)
 IQ3 50MP, IQ3 60MP, IQ3 80MP - May 2015
 IQ3 100MP - January 2016
 IQ3 100MP Achromatic - April 2017
 Phase One iXG - August 2017
 IQ3 100MP Trichromatic - September 2017
 Phase One iXM - April 2018
 IQ4 150, IQ4 150 Achromatic, IQ4 100 Trichromatic - August 2018
 Phase One iXM-RS150F August 2018
 Phase One iXM-MV - February 2019
 Phase One XT - September 2019
 Phase One iXH - April 2020
 Phase One iXM-RS 280F - April 2020
 Phase One PAS880 - December 2020
 Phase One P3 Drone Payload - April 2021
 Phase One iXM-GS 120 - January 2022

References

 Reviews
 pdnonline.com: 2011 Photo Gear of the Year
 news.cnet.com: Phase One IQ180: 80 megapixels of lavish color
 dxomark.com: Phase One IQ 180: the new king of all sensors
 wired.com: What Would You Do With 80 Million Pixels? (IQ180)

 Phase One material
 List of serial number prefix to identify model of camera back
 Official Press release announcing Phase One becoming major shareholder in Mamiya Digital Imaging
 Official Press release announcing Phase One starting the new subsidiary "Leaf Imaging"
 Official Press release announcing Phase One cooperation with Schneider Kreuznach to develop lenses

External links
 
 Mamiya Leaf web site 
 Official Press release announcing Phase One cooperation with Schneider Kreuznach to develop lenses

Photography companies of Denmark
Digital camera backs
Technology companies based in Copenhagen
Danish companies established in 1993
Danish brands